Khosrud (also Romanized as Khosrūd and Khosrood) is a village in Dastjerd Rural District, Alamut-e Gharbi District, Qazvin County, Qazvin Province, Iran. At the 2006 census, its population was 248, in 68 families.

References 

Populated places in Qazvin County